Bank Street is a village in Malvern Hills District, Worcestershire, England.

Villages in Worcestershire